Túpac Katari or Catari (also Túpaj Katari) (c. 1750 – November 13, 1781), born Julián Apasa Nina, was the indigenous Aymara leader of a major insurrection in colonial-era Upper Peru (now Bolivia), laying siege to La Paz for six months. His wife Bartolina Sisa and his sister Gregoria Apaza participated in the rebellion by his side. The rebellion was ultimately put down by Spanish loyalists and Katari was executed by quartering.

Biography

Katari was born Julián Apasa in the jurisdiction of Sicasica and later moved to the nearby town of Ayoayo. He was born a peasant and worked as a trader of coca and baize.

A member of the Aymara, Apasa took the name "Tupac Katari" to honor two earlier rebel leaders: Tomás Katari, and Túpac Amaru, executed by the Spanish in 1572. Katari's uprising was simultaneous with the Rebellion of Túpac Amaru II, whose cacique leader claimed to be a descendant of the earlier Túpac Amaru. Túpac Katari had no traditional claim to leadership similar to that of Túpac Amaru II, which may well have prompted Katari to associate himself with earlier leaders. Katari claimed authority from Túpac Amaru and proclaimed himself viceroy of the region. (Katari means "serpent, large snake" in Aymara; Amaru means the same in Quechua, the language of Tupac Amaru. Tupac means "brilliant, resplendent" in both languages.)

He raised an army of some 40,000 and laid siege to the city of La Paz in 1781. Katari and his wife Bartolina Sisa set up court in El Alto and maintained the siege from March to June and from August to October. Sisa was a commander of the siege, and played the crucial role following Katari's capture in April. The siege was broken by the Spanish colonial troops who advanced from Lima and Buenos Aires. During the siege, 20,000 people died.

Katari laid siege again later in the year, this time joined by Andrés Túpac Amaru, nephew of Túpac Amaru II, but Katari lacked adequate forces to be successful.

Katari had a reputation as a fierce and often violent leader. Other leaders in the rebel camps testified to his "homicides and enormous violence"; he was known not only for violence toward his enemies but also those who fought on his side, executing people for having "spoken against him, stolen his property, acted in an overweening fashion, challenged his authority, or humiliated him".

On his death on November 15, 1781, Katari's final words were, according to oral tradition, "." This is translated from Aymara as "I die but will return tomorrow as thousand thousands".

Rebellion

As part of the uprising, Túpac Katari formed an army of forty thousand men and surrounded twice for a time, in 1781 the Spanish city of La Paz. The two attempts, however, ended in failure due to political and military maneuvers by the Spanish, as well as alliances with indigenous leaders against Túpac Katari. Eventually all the leaders of the rebellion were arrested and executed, including Túpac Katari's wife, Bartolina Sisa, and his sister, Gregoria Apaza.

This indigenous uprising at the end of the 18th century was the largest geographically and with the most support. It took the affected viceroyalties two years to suffocate it.

The rebels besieged the city of La Paz from March 13, 1781, for one hundred and nine days without success, due to resistance and the support of troops sent from Buenos Aires. In this context, Viceroy Agustín de Jáuregui took advantage of the low morale of the rebels to offer amnesty to those who surrendered, which gave many fruits, including some leaders of the movement. Túpac Katari, who had not accepted the amnesty and went to Achacachi to reorganize his dispersed forces, was betrayed by some of his followers and was captured by the Spanish on the night of November 9, 1781.

During the second siege, Andrés Túpac Amaru, a nephew of Túpac Amaru II and romantically linked to Gregoria Apaza, Túpac Katari's younger sister, joined the Tupac Katari rebels.

As a moral reward for the efforts and sacrifices that the Spanish of the city of La Paz had to endure, through the royal decree of May 20, 1784, the city of La Paz was awarded the title of "noble, courageous and faithful" (faithful to the king of Spain, it is understood).

Legacy

For his effort, his betrayal, defeat, torture and brutal execution, Túpac Katari is remembered as a hero by modern indigenous movements in Bolivia, who call their political philosophy Katarismo. A Bolivian guerrilla group, the Tupac Katari Guerrilla Army, also bears his name.

In Bolivia, on July 15, 2005, former President Eduardo Rodriguez Veltze declared (through Law No. 3102) "National Aymara Hero and Heroine to Julián Apaza and Bartolina Sisa."

In Argentina, as part of the Bicentennial celebrations, a Gallery of Latin American Patriots was inaugurated on May 25, 2010, in which Bolivia is represented by portraits of Túpac Katari, Pedro Domingo Murillo and Bartolina Sisa. The pictorial sample is located in the so-called "Hall of the Bicentennial Heroes", in the Casa Rosada.

The first Bolivian telecommunications satellite, Túpac Katari 1, whose purpose is to support educational initiatives and maintain state security, bears his name.

Since 2019, his appearance has been incorporated into the new design of the 200 Bolivian banknote.

See also
 Túpac Amaru II
Rebellion of Túpac Amaru II
Tomás Katari
Aymara people
Bolivia
Bartolina Sisa
Katarismo
Túpac Katari Guerrilla Army

Further reading

del Valle de Siles, María Eugenia, Historia de la rebelión Túpac Catari, 1781–1782. (1900)
Fisher, Lillian Estelle, The Last Inca Revolt, 1780–1783. 1966.
O'Phelan Godoy, Rebellions and Revolts in Eighteenth-Century Peru and Upper Peru. 1985.
Paredes, M. Rigoberto, Túpac Catari: Apuntes biográficos (1897, 1973).
 
Stern, Steve J., ed. Resistance, Rebellion, and Consciousness in the Andean Peasant World, 18th to 20th Centuries. 1987.
Valencia Vega, Alipio, Julián Tupaj Katari, caudillo de la liberación india. 1950

References

External links
tupackatari.org : Bolivian indigenous activist page (in Spanish) (link broken)
Boston Globe article on Bolivian politics, mentioning Tupac Katari.
Great Rebellion of Peru and Upper Peru by Nicholas A. Robins

Bolivian people of Aymara descent
Bolivian torture victims
Executed revolutionaries
People executed by dismemberment
1750s births
1781 deaths
Executed Bolivian people
Rebellions in South America
Rebellions against the Spanish Empire
Indigenous rebellions against the Spanish Empire
18th-century executions by Spain
18th-century Bolivian people